All in the Family is an American television sitcom that aired on CBS for nine seasons, from January 12, 1971, to April 8, 1979. Afterwards, it was produced as the continuation series Archie Bunker's Place, which picked up where All in the Family had ended and ran for four more seasons through 1983.

Based on the British sitcom Till Death Us Do Part, All in the Family was produced by Norman Lear and Bud Yorkin. It starred Carroll O'Connor, Jean Stapleton, Sally Struthers, and Rob Reiner.  The show revolves around the life of a working-class man and his family. The show broke ground in its depiction of issues previously considered unsuitable for a US network television comedy, such as racism, antisemitism, infidelity, homosexuality, women's liberation, rape, religion, miscarriages, abortion, breast cancer, the Vietnam War, menopause, and impotence. Through depicting these controversial issues, the series became arguably one of television's most influential comedic programs, as it injected the sitcom format with more dramatic moments and realistic, topical conflicts.

All in the Family is often regarded in the United States as one of the greatest television series in history. The show soon became the most watched show in the United States during the summer reruns of the first season, and afterwards ranked number one in the yearly Nielsen ratings from 1971 to 1976. It became the first television series to reach the milestone of having topped the Nielsen ratings for five consecutive years. The episode "Sammy's Visit" was ranked number 13 on TV Guide's 100 Greatest Episodes of All Time. TV Guide's 50 Greatest TV Shows of All Time ranked All in the Family as number four. Bravo also named the show's protagonist, Archie Bunker, TV's greatest character of all time. In 2013, the Writers Guild of America ranked All in the Family the fourth-best written TV series ever.

Premise
All in the Family is about a working-class Caucasian family living in Queens, New York. Its patriarch is Archie Bunker (O'Connor), an outspoken, narrow-minded man, seemingly prejudiced against everyone who is not like him or his idea of how people should be. Archie's wife Edith (Jean Stapleton) is sweet and understanding, though somewhat naïve and uneducated; her husband sometimes disparagingly calls her "dingbat". Their one child, Gloria (Sally Struthers), is generally kind and good-natured like her mother, but displays traces of her father's stubbornness and temper; unlike them, she is a feminist. Gloria is married to college, later graduate student, later college instructor Michael Stivic (Reiner)–referred to as "Meathead" by Archie–whose values are likewise influenced and shaped by the counterculture of the 1960s. The two couples represent the real-life clash of values between the Greatest Generation and Baby Boomers. For much of the series, the Stivics live in the Bunkers' home to save money, providing abundant opportunity for them to irritate each other.

The show is set in the Astoria section of Queens, with the vast majority of scenes taking place in the Bunkers' home at 704 Hauser Street. Occasional scenes take place in other locations, especially during later seasons, such as Kelsey's Bar, a neighborhood tavern that Archie spends a good deal of time in and eventually purchases, and the Stivics' home after Mike and Gloria move out.

Supporting characters represent the changing demographics of the neighborhood, especially the Jeffersons, a black family, who live in the house next door in the early seasons.

Cast

Main characters

 Carroll O'Connor as Archie Bunker: Frequently called a "lovable bigot", Archie was an assertively prejudiced blue-collar worker. A World War II veteran, Archie longs for better times when people sharing his viewpoint were in charge, as evidenced by the nostalgic theme song "Those Were the Days" (also the show's original title). Despite his bigotry, he is portrayed as loving and decent, as well as a man who is simply struggling to adapt to the constantly changing world, rather than someone motivated by hateful racism or prejudice. His ignorance and stubbornness seem to cause his malapropism-filled arguments to self-destruct. He often rejects uncomfortable truths by blowing a raspberry. Former child actor Mickey Rooney was Lear's first choice to play Archie, but Rooney declined the offer because of the strong potential for controversy, and in Rooney's opinion, a poor chance for success. 
 Jean Stapleton as Edith Bunker, née Baines: Edith is Archie's ditzy but kind-hearted wife. Archie often tells her to "stifle" herself and calls her a "dingbat", and although Edith generally defers to her husband's authority and endures his insults, on the rare occasions when Edith takes a stand, she proves to have a simple but profound wisdom. Despite their different personalities, they love each other deeply.  Stapleton developed Edith's distinctive voice.  Stapleton remained with the show through the original series run, but decided to leave at that time. During the first season of Archie Bunker's Place, Edith was seen in five of the first fourteen episodes in guest appearances. After being largely carried as an invisible character, Edith was written out as having suffered a stroke and died off-camera in the following season, leaving Archie to deal with the death of his beloved "dingbat". Stapleton appeared in all but four episodes of All in the Family. In the series' first episode, Edith is portrayed as being less of a dingbat and even sarcastically refers to her husband as "Mr. Religion, here ..." after they come home from church, something her character would not be expected to say later. 
 Sally Struthers as Gloria Stivic, née Bunker: The Bunkers' college-aged daughter who is married to Michael Stivic. She has the generally kind nature of her mother, but the stubbornness of her father, which early in the series manifests as childishness, later as a more mature feminism. Gloria frequently attempts to mediate between her father and husband, generally siding with the latter. The roles of the Bunkers' daughter and son-in-law (then named "Dickie") initially went to Candice Azzara and Chip Oliver. After seeing the show's pilot, ABC requested a second pilot expressing dissatisfaction with both actors. Lear later recast the roles of Gloria and Dickie with Struthers and Reiner. Penny Marshall (Reiner's wife, whom he married in April 1971, shortly after the program began) was also considered for the role of Gloria. During the earlier seasons of the show, Struthers was known to be discontented with how static her part was and, in 1974, sued to get out of her contract.  But the character became more developed, satisfying her. Struthers appeared in 157 of the 202 episodes during the first eight seasons—from January 12, 1971, to March 19, 1978. She later reprised the role in the spin-off series Gloria, which lasted one season in 1982–1983.
 Rob Reiner as Michael "Meathead" Stivic: Gloria's Polish-American hippie husband is part of the counterculture of the 1960s. While good-hearted and well-meaning, he constantly spars with Archie, and is equally stubborn, although his moral views are generally presented as being more ethical and his logic somewhat sounder. He is the most-educated person in the household, a fact which gives him a self-assured arrogance, and despite his intellectual belief in progressive social values, he tends to expect Gloria to defer to him as her husband. As discussed in All in the Family retrospectives, Richard Dreyfuss sought the part, but Norman Lear ultimately cast Reiner. Harrison Ford turned down the role, citing Archie Bunker's bigotry.  Reiner appeared in 174 of the 202 episodes of the series during the first eight seasons—from January 12, 1971, to March 19, 1978. Reiner is also credited with writing three of the series' episodes.
 Danielle Brisebois as Stephanie Mills, the cute nine-year-old daughter of Edith's cousin Floyd, who is a regular throughout the ninth season. Despite being cute and having a sweet side, she is smart, clever, and does give her own few remarks at Archie from time to time. The Bunkers take her in after her father abandons her on their doorstep in 1978 (he later extorts money from them to let them keep her). She remained with the show through its transition to Archie Bunker's Place, and appeared in all four seasons of the continuation.

Supporting characters

 Sherman Hemsley as George Jefferson, Isabel Sanford as his wife Louise, and Mike Evans as their son Lionel, Archie's black neighbors: George is Archie's combative black counterpart, while Louise is a smarter, more assertive version of Edith. Lionel first appeared in the series' premiere episode "Meet the Bunkers", with Louise appearing later in the first season. Although George had been mentioned many times, he was not seen until 1973. Hemsley, who was Norman Lear's first choice to play George, was performing in the Broadway musical Purlie and did not want to break his commitment to that show. Lear kept the role waiting for him until he had finished with the musical. Plots frequently find Archie and George at odds with one another, while Edith and Louise attempt to join forces to bring about a resolution. George and Louise later moved to an apartment in Manhattan in their own show, The Jeffersons. Lionel appeared in All In The Family as a college student early on did odd jobs around the neighbourhood.
 Mel Stewart, as George's brother Henry Jefferson: The two appeared together only once, in the 1973 episode in which the Bunkers host Henry's going-away party, marking Stewart's final episode and Hemsley's first. After the Jeffersons were spun off into their own show in 1975, Stewart's character was rarely referred to again and was never seen. In the closing credits of "The First and Last Supper" episode, Mel Stewart is incorrectly credited as playing George Jefferson. Stewart was actually playing George's brother, Henry Jefferson, who was pretending to be George for most of the episode. (Season 1–4, 8 episodes)
 Bea Arthur as Edith's cousin Maude: Maude was white-collared and ultra-liberal, the perfect foil to Archie, and one of his main antagonists. She appeared in two episodes, "Cousin Maude's Visit", where she took care of the Bunker household when all four were sick, and "Maude" from the show's second season, which was basically a backdoor pilot. Her spin-off series, Maude, began in fall 1972. (Season 2, 2 episodes)
 Betty Garrett and Vincent Gardenia as the liberal and Roman Catholic next-door neighbors Irene and Frank Lorenzo: Both first appeared as a married couple as Irene was trying to use the Bunker's phone. During an argument earlier in the episode, Archie and Mike had broken the phone wire. Irene being a 'handyman' of sorts with her own tools, which she carried in her purse, fixed it. Irene fixed many things at the Bunker house during her time on the show. She also had a sister who was a nun and appeared in one episode. "Edith's Christmas Story" reveals that Irene has had a mastectomy. Archie got her a job as a forklift operator at the plant where he worked. Irene was a strong-willed woman of Irish heritage, and Frank was a jovial Italian househusband who loved cooking and singing. He also was a salesman, but what he sold was never said. Gardenia, who also appeared as Jim Bowman in episode eight of season one (as the man who sold his house to the Jeffersons) and as Curtis Rempley in episode seven of season three (as a swinger opposite Rue McClanahan), became a semi-regular along with Garrett in 1973. Gardenia only stayed for one season as Frank Lorenzo, but Garrett remained until her character was phased-out in late 1975. (Season 4–6)
 Allan Melvin as Archie's neighbor and good friend Barney Hefner: Barney first appeared in 1972 as a recurring character. His appearances increased during subsequent seasons until he became a regular. He appeared as a regular in all four seasons of Archie Bunker's Place. Melvin also appeared in first-season episode "Archie in the Lock-up" as a desk sergeant at a police precinct.

Recurring characters
 James Cromwell as Jerome "Stretch" Cunningham (1973–1976) "The Funniest Man in The World", Archie's friend and co-worker from the loading dock (Archie claims that he is known as the "Bob Hope" of the loading platform): What Archie did not know was that Stretch was Jewish, evident only after Stretch died and Archie went to the funeral. Archie's eulogy (or "urology" as he called it) for his friend is often referred to as a rare occasion when he was capable of showing the humanity he tried so earnestly to hide. In the episode titled "Archie in the Cellar", Billy Sands is referred to as Stretch Cunningham, the voice on the tape recorder telling jokes. Sands also appeared as other characters on the show during its run, in Kelsey's Bar as a patron. (Season 5, 3 episodes)
 Liz Torres as Theresa Betancourt (1976–1977): A Puerto Rican nursing student who meets Archie when he is admitted to the hospital for surgery. She later rents Mike and Gloria's former room at the Bunker house. She called Archie "Papi". Torres joined All in the Family in the fall of 1976, but her character was not popular with viewers, and the role was phased out before the end of the season. (Season 7, 7 episodes)
 Billy Halop as Mr. Munson (1971–76), the cab driver who lets Archie use his cab to make extra money. (Season 1–3 & 5–6, 10 episodes)
 Bob Hastings as Kelcy or Tommy Kelsey, who owns the bar Archie frequents and later buys: Kelcy was also played by Frank Maxwell in the episode "Archie Gets The Business". The name of the establishment is Kelcy's Bar (as seen in the bar window in various episodes).  Due to a continuity error, the end credits of episodes involving the bar owner spell the name "Kelcy" for the first two seasons and "Kelsey" thereafter, although the end credits show "Kelcy" in the "Archie Gets the Business" episode.
 Jason Wingreen as Harry Snowden, a bartender at Kelcy's Bar who continues to work there after Archie purchases it as his business partner: Harry had tried to buy the bar from Kelcy, but Archie was able to come up with the money first, by taking a mortgage out on his house, which the Bunkers owned outright.
 Gloria LeRoy as Mildred "Boom-Boom" Turner, a buxom, middle-aged secretary at the plant where Archie works: Her first appearance was when Archie is lost on his way to a convention and Mike and Gloria suspect he and she could be having an affair. Archie gave her that moniker as she was walking by the loading dock. He said when she walked, "Boom-Boom". She is not fond of Archie because he and Stretch leer at her and because of their sexist behavior, but later becomes friendly with him, occasionally working as a barmaid at Archie's Place. Gloria LeRoy also appeared in a third-season episode as "Bobbi Jo" Loomis, the wife of Archie's old war buddy "Duke".
 Barnard Hughes as Father John Majeski, a local Catholic priest who was suspected by Archie one time of trying to convert Edith: He appeared in multiple episodes. The first time was when Edith accidentally hit Majeski's car near the local supermarket with a can of cling peaches in heavy syrup. (Season 2,3 & 4, 3 episodes)
 Eugene Roche appeared as practical jokester friend and fellow lodge member "Pinky Peterson", one of Archie Bunker's buddies, in three episodes, first in the episode "Beverly Rides Again", then the memorable Christmas Day episode called "The Draft Dodger" (episode 146, 1976), and finally the episode "Archie's Other Wife". (Season 7 & 9, 3 episodes)
 Sorrell Booke as Lyle Sanders, personnel manager at Archie Bunker's workplace, Prendergast Tool and Die Company: He had appeared on the series as Lyle Bennett, the manager of a local television station, in the episode "Archie and the Editorial" in season three.
 Lori Shannon played Beverly La Salle, a transvestite entertainer, who appeared in three episodes: "Archie the Hero", "Beverly Rides Again", and "Edith's Crisis of Faith". In that third episode, Mike and Beverly are attacked, and Beverly dies in a hospital from injuries suffered during the fight.
 Estelle Parsons as Blanche Hefner (1977–1979), Barney's second wife: Blanche and Archie are not fond of one another, though Edith likes her very much. The character is mentioned throughout much of the series after Barney's first wife, Mabel, had died, though she only appeared in a handful of episodes during the last few seasons. Estelle Parsons also appeared in the season-seven episode "Archie's Secret Passion" as Dolores Fencel. (Season 7 & 9)
 Bill Quinn as Mr. Edgar van Ranseleer (Mr. van R), a blind patron and regular at the bar: He was almost never referred to by his first name. In a running joke, Archie usually waves his hand in front of Mr. van R's face when he speaks to him. His role was later expanded on Archie Bunker's Place, where he appeared in all four seasons.
 Burt Mustin as Justin Quigley, a feisty octogenarian/nonagenarian: Mr. Quigley first appeared in the episode: "Edith Finds an Old Man" (season four, episode three, September 23, 1973) where he runs away from an old age home. He temporarily moves in with the Bunkers but quickly leaves to share an apartment with his friend Josephine "Jo" Nelson, played by Ruth McDevitt. He appeared in several other episodes, including "Archie's Weighty Problem". Mr. Mustin previously appeared in a first-season episode as Harry Feeney, the night watchman at Archie's workplace. (1, 4–6, 5 episodes)
 Nedra Volz as Aunt Iola: Edith's aunt, she was mentioned several times in the eighth season and stayed with the Bunkers for two weeks. Edith wanted her to move in, but Archie would not allow it, though when he thought Iola did not have any place to go, he told her privately that she could always stay with them.
 Francine Beers and Jane Connell as Sybil Gooley, who worked at Ferguson's Market: Frequently mentioned, usually by Edith, Sybil predicted that Gloria and Mike were having a baby boy by performing a ring on a string "swing test" over Gloria's abdomen. Sybil also appeared in the episode "Edith's 50th Birthday" and spilled the beans on her surprise party because she had not been invited.  Archie and she did not get along, and he referred to her as a "Big Mouth".
 Rae Allen and Elizabeth Wilson as Edith's cousin Amelia DeKuyper: Archie detests Amelia and her husband, Russell, who are wealthy. Once, she sent Edith a mink and Archie wanted to send it back, until he found out how much it was worth. In another episode, Amelia and her husband visit the Bunkers to bring them gifts from a recent trip to Hawaii, but in a private moment, Amelia shares with Edith that, despite appearances, she and Russell are considering a divorce. The character was played by two different actresses in three episodes of the show.
 Richard Dysart and George S. Irving as Russell DeKuyper, Amelia's husband. He is a plumbing contractor who continued the business started by Amelia's father and uncles. He constantly flaunts his monetary wealth in front of Archie and looks askance at the way Archie lives, forgetting that he walked into a profitable plumbing business. He appeared in two of the episodes that featured Amelia.
 Clyde Kusatsu as Reverend Chong appeared in three episodes. He refused to baptize little Joey in season six, and then remarried Archie and Edith, and Mike and Gloria in season eight, and gave counsel to Stephanie in season nine as it was learned that she was Jewish. (Season 6, 8 & 9, 3 episodes)
 Ruth McDevitt as Josephine "Jo" Nelson: She played the girlfriend of Justin Quigley, the older man Edith found walking around the supermarket. She appeared in three episodes from seasons four through six. Gloria and Mike adopted them as their god grandparents. Of most of the characters, Archie took a liking to Justin and Jo. She died following the end of the sixth season. (Season 4 & 5, 3 episodes)
 William Benedict as Jimmy McNabb: The Bunkers' neighbor, he appeared in two episodes during the first and second seasons, and was referred to many times during the first few seasons.
 Jack Grimes as Mr. Whitehead: A member of Archie's lodge, he was the local funeral director. The death of Archie's cousin Oscar in a season-two episode of All in the Family brings the very short, white-haired, and silver-tongued Whitehead with his catalog of caskets. (Season 2 & 4, 2 episodes)

History and production

The show came about when Norman Lear read an article in Variety magazine on Till Death Us Do Part and its success in the United Kingdom. He immediately knew it portrayed a relationship just like the one between his father and himself.

Lear bought the rights to the show and incorporated his own family experiences with his father into the show. Lear's father would tell Lear's mother to "stifle herself" and she would tell Lear's father "you are the laziest white man I ever saw" (two "Archieisms" that found their way onto the show).

The original pilot was titled Justice for All and was developed for ABC. Tom Bosley, Jack Warden, and Jackie Gleason were all considered for the role of Archie Bunker. In fact, CBS wanted to buy the rights to the original show and retool it specifically for Gleason, who was under contract to them, but producer  Lear beat out CBS for the rights and offered the show to ABC. Mickey Rooney was offered the role but turned it down as he felt the character was "un-American".

In the pilot, Carroll O'Connor and Jean Stapleton played Archie and Edith Justice. Kelly Jean Peters played Gloria and Tim McIntire played her husband, Richard. It was taped in October 1968 in New York City. After screening the first pilot, ABC gave the producers more money to shoot a second pilot, titled Those Were the Days, which Lear taped in February 1969 in Hollywood. Candice Azzara played Gloria and Chip Oliver played Richard. D'Urville Martin played Lionel Jefferson in both pilots.

After stations' and viewers' complaints caused ABC to cancel Turn-On (a sketch comedy series developed by Laugh-In's George Schlatter) after only one episode in February 1969, the network became uneasy about airing a show with a "foul-mouthed, bigoted lead" character, and rejected the series at about the time Richard Dreyfuss sought the role of Michael. Rival network CBS was eager to update its image and was looking to replace much of its then popular "rural" programming (Mayberry R.F.D., The Beverly Hillbillies, Petticoat Junction and Green Acres) with more "urban", contemporary series and was interested in Lear's project; by this point, Gleason was no longer under contract to CBS (his own show was among those eliminated), allowing Lear to keep Carroll O'Connor on as the lead. CBS bought the rights from ABC and retitled the show All in the Family. The pilot episode CBS developed had the final cast and was the series' first episode.

Lear wanted to shoot in black and white as Till Death Us Do Part had been. While CBS insisted on color, Lear had the set furnished in neutral tones, keeping everything relatively devoid of color.  As costume designer Rita Riggs described in her 2001 Archive of American Television interview, Lear's idea was to create the feeling of sepia tones, in an attempt to make viewers feel as if they were looking at an old family album.

All in the Family was the first major American series to be videotaped in front of a live studio audience. In the 1960s, most sitcoms had been filmed in the single-camera format without audiences, with a laugh track simulating an audience response. Lear employed the multiple-camera format of shooting in front of an audience, but used tape, whereas previous multiple-camera shows like The Mary Tyler Moore Show had used film. Due to the success of All in the Family, videotaping sitcoms in front of an audience became a common format for the genre during the 1970s, onward, until the advent of digital HD. The use of videotape also gave All in the Family the look and feel of early live television, including the original live broadcasts of The Honeymooners, to which All in the Family is sometimes compared.

For the show's final season, the practice of being taped before a live audience changed to playing the already taped and edited show to an audience and recording their laughter to add to the original sound track,  and the voice-over during the end credits were changed from Rob Reiner's voice to Carroll O'Connor's (typically, the audience was gathered for a taping of One Day at a Time, and got to see All In the Family as a bonus.). Throughout its run, Norman Lear took pride in the fact that canned laughter was never used (mentioning this on many occasions); the laughter heard in the episodes was genuine.

Theme song

The series' opening theme song "Those Were the Days", was written by Lee Adams (lyrics) and Charles Strouse (music). It was presented in a way that was unique for a 1970s series: Carroll O'Connor and Jean Stapleton were seated at a console or spinet piano (played by Stapleton) and sang the tune together on-camera at the start of every episode, concluding with applause from a studio audience. (The song dates back to the first Justice For All pilot filmed in 1968, although on that occasion O'Connor and Stapleton performed the song off-camera and at a faster tempo than the series version.) Six different performances were recorded over the run of the series, including one version that includes additional lyrics. The song is a simple, pentatonic melody (that can be played exclusively with black keys on a piano) in which Archie and Edith wax nostalgic for the simpler days of yesteryear. A longer version of the song was released as a single on Atlantic Records, reaching number 43 on the US Billboard Hot 100 and number 30 on the Billboard Adult Contemporary chart in early 1972; the additional lyrics in this longer version lend the song a greater sense of sadness and make poignant reference to social changes taking place in the 1960s and early 1970s.

A few perceptible drifts can be observed when listening to each version chronologically. In the original version, the lyric "Those Were The Days" was sung over the tonic (root chord of the song's key), and the piano strikes a dominant 7th passing chord in transition to the next part, which is absent from subsequent versions. Jean Stapleton's screeching high note on the line "And you knew who you WEEERRE then" became louder, longer, and more comical, although only in the original version did the line draw a laugh from the audience. Carroll O'Connor's pronunciation of "welfare state" added more of Archie's trademark whining enunciation, and the closing lyrics (especially "Gee, our old LaSalle ran great") were sung with increasingly deliberate articulation, as viewers had complained that they could not understand the words. Also in the original version, the camera angle was shot slightly from the right side of the talent as opposed to the straight on angle of the next version. Jean Stapleton performed the theme song without glasses beginning in season 6.

In addition to O'Connor and Stapleton singing, footage is also shown beginning with aerial shots of Manhattan, and continuing to Queens, progressively zooming in, culminating with a still shot of a lower middle-class semidetached home, presumably representing the Bunkers' house in Astoria, suggesting that the visit to the Bunkers' home has begun. The house shown in the opening credits is actually located at 89–70 Cooper Avenue in the Glendale section of Queens, New York. A notable difference exists, between the Cooper Avenue house and the All in the Family set:  the Cooper Avenue house has no porch, while the Bunkers' home featured a front porch. Since the footage  used for the opening had been shot back in 1968 for the series' first pilot,  the establishing shot of the Manhattan skyline was completely devoid of the World Trade Center towers, which had not yet been built. When the series aired two years later, the Trade Center towers, although under construction, had still not yet risen high enough to become a prominent feature on the Manhattan skyline (this did not happen until the end of 1971). Despite this change in the Manhattan skyline, the original, somewhat grainy 1968 footage continued to be used for the series opening until the series transitioned into Archie Bunker's Place in 1979. At that time, a new opening with current shots of the Manhattan skyline were used with the Trade Center towers being seen in the closing credits. This opening format – showing actual footage of the cities and neighborhoods in which the show was set – became the standard for most of Norman Lear's sitcoms, including others in the All in the Family franchise – Maude, Good Times, and The Jeffersons.

At the end of the opening, the camera then returns to a last few seconds of O'Connor and Stapleton, as they finish the song. At the end of the original version, Edith smiles at Archie and Archie smiles off at a slight distance.  In the longest running version (from season 2 to season 5), Edith smiles blissfully at Archie, and Archie puts a cigar in his mouth and returns a rather cynical, sheepish look to Edith.  From season six through eight, Edith smiles and rests her chin on Archie's shoulder.  In the final season, Edith hugs Archie at the conclusion. Additionally, in the first three versions of the opening, Archie is seen wearing his classic trademark white shirt. In the final version of the opening for the series' ninth season, Archie is seen wearing a grey sweater-jacket over his white shirt. In all versions of the opening, the song's conclusion is accompanied by applause from the studio audience.

In interviews, Norman Lear explained that the idea for the piano song introduction was a cost-cutting measure. After completion of the pilot episode, the budget would not allow an elaborate scene to serve as the sequence played during the show's opening credits. Lear decided to have a simple scene of Archie and Edith singing at the piano.

The closing theme (an instrumental) was "Remembering You", played by its composer Roger Kellaway, with lyrics later added by Carroll O'Connor. It was played over footage of the same row of houses in Queens as in the opening (but moving in the opposite direction down the street), and eventually moving back to aerial shots of Manhattan, suggesting the visit to the Bunkers' home has concluded. O'Connor recorded a vocal version of "Remembering You" for a record album, but though he performed it several times on TV appearances, the lyrics (about the end of a romance) were never heard in the actual series. In July 1986, vocalist Helen Merrill's contrastingly jazz-flavored rendition, accompanied by a Kellaway-led trio and introduced by O'Connor, was featured on The Merv Griffin Show.

Except for some brief instances in the first season, scenes contained no background or transitional music.

Setting and location

Lear and his writers set the series in the Queens neighborhood of Astoria. The location of the Bunkers' house at 704 Hauser Street is fictitious (no Hauser Street exists in Queens). The address is not presented the way addresses are given in Queens: most address numbers are hyphenated, identifying the number of the nearest cross street. Nevertheless, many episodes reveal that the Bunkers live near the major thoroughfare Northern Boulevard, which was the location of Kelsey's Bar and later Archie Bunker's Place.

The exterior of the house shown at the show opening is a home located at 89–70 Cooper Avenue, Glendale, Queens, New York, across from St. John Cemetery.

Many real Queens institutions are mentioned throughout the series. Carroll O'Connor, a Queens native from Forest Hills, said in an interview with the Archive of American Television that he suggested to the writers many of the locations to give the series authenticity. For example, Archie is said to have attended Flushing High School, a real school in Flushing, Queens (although in the "Man of the Year" episode of Archie Bunker's Place, Archie attended Bryant High School in nearby Long Island City). As another example, the 1976 episode "The Baby Contest" deals with Archie entering baby Joey in a cutest-baby contest sponsored by the Long Island Daily Press, a then-operating local newspaper in Queens and Long Island.

The writers of All in the Family continued throughout the series to have the Bunkers and other characters use telephone exchange names when giving a telephone number (most other series at the time, such as The Mary Tyler Moore Show, were using the standard fictitious 555 telephone exchange) at a time when the Bell System was trying to discontinue them. At different times throughout the series, the exchanges Ravenswood and Bayside – both valid in the area – were used for the Bunkers' telephone number. Actual residents of the Bunkers' age continued using exchange names into the early 1980s, which is referred to in the 1979 episode "The Appendectomy", in which Edith gets confused between the two versions of a number she is dialing.

Episodes

"Sammy's Visit", first broadcast in February 1972, is a particularly notable episode, whose famous episode-ending scene produced the longest sustained audience laughter in the history of the show. Guest star Sammy Davis Jr. plays himself.  Archie is moonlighting as a cab driver and Davis visits the Bunker home to retrieve a briefcase he left in Archie's cab earlier that day. After hearing Archie's bigoted remarks, Davis asks for a photograph with him.  At the moment the picture is taken, Davis suddenly kisses a stunned Archie on the cheek. The ensuing laughter went on for so long that it had to be severely edited for network broadcast, as Carroll O'Connor still had one line ("Well, what the hell — he said it was in his contract!") to deliver after the kiss. (The line is usually cut in syndication.)

Syndication
During the show's sixth season, starting on December 1, 1975, CBS began airing reruns on weekdays at 3p.m. (EST), replacing long-running soap opera The Edge of Night, which moved to ABC. The show would later move to 3:30p.m. and in September 1978, 10a.m. This lasted until September 1979, when Viacom distributed the reruns to the off-network market where many stations picked up the show. In 1991, Columbia Pictures Television began syndicating the show, and Columbia's successor companies have continued to do so.

Since the late 1980s, All in the Family has been rerun on various cable and satellite networks including TBS (although it held the rights locally in Atlanta, as well), TV Land, Nick at Nite, and Sundance TV. From January 3, 2011, to December 31, 2017, the show aired on Antenna TV. As of January 1, 2018, the show began to air on GetTV.  Starting February 5, 2023, MeTV will begin airing four episodes of the show on Sunday nights at 8:00 PM ET/7:00 PM CT.

The cast forfeited their residual rights for a cash payout early in the production run.

Ratings
All in the Family is one of three television shows (The Cosby Show and the reality music competition American Idol being the others) that have been number one in the Nielsen ratings for five consecutive TV seasons. The show remained in the top 10 for seven of its nine seasons.

The series finale was seen by 40.2 million viewers.

Spin-offs
, All in the Family has the most spin-offs for a prime-time television series, directly spawning five other shows, three of which were very successful, as well as two of those spin-offs each having a spin-off of their own.

The first spin-off was Maude, which debuted in September 1972. It features Edith's acerbic cousin Maude Findlay (Bea Arthur), who first appeared on All in the Family in the December 1971 episode "Cousin Maude's Visit", visiting to take care of the influenza-suffering Bunkers. In March 1972, at the end of the series' second season, the character was again featured in the episode "Maude". In this episode, a "backdoor pilot" for a new series, Archie and Edith visit her home in Westchester County to attend the wedding of her daughter Carol. Bill Macy played Maude's husband Walter and Marcia Rodd played Carol; Rodd was replaced by Adrienne Barbeau for the series. The show lasted for six seasons and 141 episodes, airing its final episode in April 1978.
Good Times is considered by some to be a spin-off of Maude, as the show's focus was Florida Evans, a character first appearing on Maude during its initial seasons as the Findlays' black maid.  But the character's history and situation were changed for the new show. According to producer Allan Manings, "It wasn't really a spin-off." The show features no reference to Maude, changes the name of Florida's husband from Henry to James, and sets the show in a Chicago housing project. It ran for six seasons from February 1974 to August 1979.
The second and longest-lasting spin-off of All in the Family was The Jeffersons. Debuting on CBS in January 1975, The Jeffersons lasted 11 seasons and 253 episodes (more than All in the Family's nine seasons and 208 episodes). The main characters were the Bunkers' black former next-door neighbors George and Louise Jefferson (Sherman Hemsley and Isabel Sanford). George was the owner of seven successful dry-cleaning stores, and the series featured their life after moving from the Bunkers' working-class neighborhood to a luxury high-rise apartment building in Manhattan's Upper East Side. 
Checking In was spun off from The Jeffersons, focusing on the Jeffersons' maid Florence Johnston, working as an executive housekeeper at the St. Frederick Hotel in Manhattan. It only lasted four weeks in April 1981, and the character returned to her old job as the Jeffersons' maid.
Archie Bunker's Place was technically a spin-off, but was essentially a renamed continuation of the series, beginning in September 1979 following the final season of the original. It was primarily set in the titular neighborhood tavern which Archie Bunker purchased in the eighth season of All in the Family. It aired for four seasons, until April 1983.
Gloria was the third spin-off of All in the Family, focusing on now-divorced Gloria, starting a new life as an assistant trainee to a couple of veterinarians in Foxridge, New York. It premiered in September 1982, and ran for one season.
704 Hauser features the Bunkers' house with a new family, the Cumberbatches. It was an inversion of the formula of the original, featuring a liberal black couple with a conservative son, who is dating a Jewish woman. Gloria and Mike's son Joey Stivic, now in his 20s, makes a brief appearance in the first episode. Five episodes aired in April and May 1994. The sixth episode was unaired.

Specials 

At the height of the show's popularity, Henry Fonda hosted a special one-hour retrospective of All in the Family and its impact on American television. It included clips from the show's most memorable episodes up to that time. It was titled The Best of "All in the Family", and aired on December 21, 1974.

On February 16, 1991, CBS aired a 90-minute retrospective, All in the Family 20th Anniversary Special, hosted by Norman Lear to commemorate the show's 20th anniversary.  It featured a compilation of clips from the show's best moments, and interviews with the four main cast members. The special was so well received by the viewing audience CBS aired reruns of All in the Family during its summer schedule in 1991, garnering higher ratings than the new series scheduled next to it, Norman Lear's sitcom Sunday Dinner. The latter was Lear's return to TV series producing after a seven-year absence, and was cancelled after the six-week tryout run due to being poorly received by audiences.

On May 22, 2019, ABC broadcast Live in Front of a Studio Audience: Norman Lear's All in the Family and The Jeffersons, produced by Lear and Jimmy Kimmel and starring Woody Harrelson, Marisa Tomei, Jamie Foxx, Wanda Sykes, Ike Barinholtz, Kerry Washington and Ellie Kemper.

A second Live in Front of A Studio Audience special was announced in early November 2019 to air on Wednesday December 18, this time pairing the show with Good Times.

Home media
Sony Pictures Home Entertainment (formerly Columbia TriStar Home Entertainment) released the first six seasons of All in the Family on DVD in Region 1 between 2002 and 2007. No further seasons were released, because the sales figures did not match Sony's expectations.

On June 23, 2010, Shout! Factory announced that it had acquired the rights to the series, and has since released the remaining three seasons.

On October 30, 2012, Shout! Factory released All in the Family – The Complete Series on DVD in Region 1.  The 28-disc boxed set features all 208 episodes of the series, as well as bonus features.

On February 6, 2018, Sony released All in the Family- Seasons 1–5 on DVD in Region 1.  The 15-disc set features all episodes from the first five seasons.

Cultural impact

As one of US television's most acclaimed and groundbreaking programs, All in the Family has been referenced or parodied in countless other forms of media. References on other sitcoms include That '70s Show, The Simpsons, and Family Guy.

Popular T-shirts, buttons, and bumper stickers showing O'Connor's image and farcically promoting "Archie Bunker for President" appeared around the time of the 1972 presidential election. In 1998, All in the Family was honored on a 33-cent stamp by the USPS.

Archie and Edith Bunker's chairs are on display in the Smithsonian National Museum of American History. The originals had been purchased by the show's set designer for a few dollars at a local Goodwill thrift store, and were given to the Smithsonian (for an exhibit on American television history) in 1978. It cost producers thousands of dollars to create replicas to replace the originals.

Then-US President Richard Nixon can be heard discussing the show (specifically the 1971 episodes "Writing the President" and "Judging Books by Covers") on one of the infamous Watergate tapes.

Rapper Redman has made references to Archie Bunker in a few of his songs, specifically his smoking of large cigars.

Mad parodied the series in their 1973 special issue #11 entitled "Gall in the Family Fare", which also included a free flexi-disc record so the reader could listen to the parody as they read it.

Awards and nominations
All in the Family is the first of four sitcoms in which all the lead actors (O'Connor, Stapleton, Struthers, and Reiner) won Primetime Emmy Awards. The other three are The Golden Girls, Will & Grace and Schitt's Creek.

Primetime Emmy awards and nominations
1971
Outstanding New Series (Won)
Outstanding Series – Comedy (Won)
Outstanding Continued Performance by an Actor in a Leading Role in a Comedy Series: Carroll O'Connor (Nominated)
Outstanding Continued Performance by an Actress in a Leading Role in a Comedy Series: Jean Stapleton (Won)
Outstanding Directorial Achievement in Comedy: John Rich for "Gloria's Pregnant" (Nominated)
Outstanding Writing Achievement in Comedy:
 Norman Lear for "Meet the Bunkers" (Nominated)
 Stanley Ralph Ross for "Oh, My Aching Back" (Nominated)
1972
Outstanding Series – Comedy (Won)
Outstanding Single Program – Drama or Comedy for "Sammy's Visit" (Nominated)
Outstanding Achievement in Live or Tape Sound Mixing: Norman Dewes for "The Elevator Story" (Won)
Outstanding Continued Performance by an Actor in a Leading Role in a Comedy Series: Carroll O'Connor (Won)
Outstanding Continued Performance by an Actress in a Leading Role in a Comedy Series: Jean Stapleton (Won)
Outstanding Performance by an Actor in a Supporting Role in a Comedy Series: Rob Reiner (Nominated)
Outstanding Performance by an Actress in a Supporting Role in a Comedy Series: Sally Struthers (Won)
Outstanding Directorial Achievement in Comedy: John Rich for "Sammy's Visit" (Won)
Outstanding Writing Achievement in Comedy:
 Burt Styler for "Edith's Problem" (Won)
Alan J. Levitt and Philip Mishkin for "Mike's Problem" (Nominated)
Norman Lear and Burt Styler for "The Saga of Cousin Oscar" (Nominated)
1973
Outstanding Comedy Series (Won)
Outstanding Continued Performance by an Actor in a Leading Role in a Comedy Series: Carroll O'Connor (Nominated)
Outstanding Continued Performance by an Actress in a Leading Role in a Comedy Series: Jean Stapleton (Nominated)
Outstanding Performance by an Actor in a Supporting Role in a Comedy Series: Rob Reiner (Nominated)
Outstanding Performance by an Actress in a Supporting Role in a Comedy Series: Sally Struthers (Nominated)
Outstanding Directorial Achievement in Comedy: Bob LaHendro and John Rich for "The Bunkers and the Swingers" (Nominated)
Outstanding Writing Achievement in Comedy: Lee Kalcheim & Michael Ross & Bernie West for "The Bunkers and the Swingers" (Won)
1974
Outstanding Comedy Series (Nominated)
Best Lead Actor in a Comedy Series: Carroll O'Connor (Nominated)
Best Lead Actress in a Comedy Series: Jean Stapleton (Nominated)
Best Supporting Actor in a Comedy Series: Rob Reiner (Won)
Best Supporting Actress in a Comedy Series: Sally Struthers (Nominated)
1975
Outstanding Comedy Series (Nominated)
Outstanding Lead Actor in a Comedy Series: Carroll O'Connor (Nominated)
Outstanding Lead Actress in a Comedy Series: Jean Stapleton (Nominated)
Outstanding Continuing Performance by a Supporting Actor in a Comedy Series: Rob Reiner (Nominated)
1976
Outstanding Comedy Series (Nominated)
1977
Outstanding Comedy Series (Nominated)
Outstanding Lead Actor in a Comedy Series: Carroll O'Connor (Won)
Outstanding Lead Actress in a Comedy Series: Jean Stapleton (Nominated)
Outstanding Directing for a Comedy Series: Paul Bogart for "The Draft Dodger" (Nominated)
Outstanding Art Direction or Scenic Design for a Comedy Series: Don Roberts for "The Unemployment Story" (Nominated)
1978
Outstanding Comedy Series (Won)
Outstanding Lead Actor in a Comedy Series: Carroll O'Connor (Won)
Outstanding Lead Actress in a Comedy Series: Jean Stapleton (Won)
Outstanding Continuing Performance by a Supporting Actor in a Comedy Series: Rob Reiner (Won)
Outstanding Continuing Performance by a Supporting Actress in a Comedy Series: Sally Struthers (Nominated)
Outstanding Directing for a Comedy Series: Paul Bogart for "Edith's 50th Birthday" (Won)
Outstanding Writing for a Comedy Series:
Bob Schiller and Bob Weiskopf for "Edith's 50th Birthday" (Nominated)
Larry Rhine & Erik Tarloff & Mel Tolkin for "Edith's Crisis of Faith" (Nominated)
Harve Brosten & Barry Harman & Bob Schiller & Bob Weiskopf for "Cousin Liz" (Won)
1979
Outstanding Comedy Series (Nominated)
Outstanding Lead Actor in a Comedy Series: Carroll O'Connor (Won)
Outstanding Lead Actress in a Comedy Series: Jean Stapleton (Nominated)
Outstanding Supporting Actress in a Comedy, Comedy-Variety, or Music Series: Sally Struthers (Won)
Outstanding Directing for a Comedy, Comedy-Variety, or Music Series: Paul Bogart for "California, Here We Are" (Nominated)
Outstanding Writing for a Comedy, Comedy-Variety, or Music Series: Milt Josefsberg & Bob Schiller & Phil Sharp & Bob Weiskopf for "California, Here We Are" (Nominated)
Outstanding Video Tape Editing for a Series: Harvey W. Berger and Hal Collins for "The 200th Episode Celebration of 'All in the Family'" (Nominated)

Golden Globe Awards and Nominations

1972
Best TV Show – Musical/Comedy (Won)
Best TV Actor – Musical/Comedy: Carroll O'Connor (Won)
Best TV Actress – Musical/Comedy: Jean Stapleton (Nominated)
Best Supporting Actor – Television: Rob Reiner (Nominated)
Best Supporting Actress – Television: Sally Struthers (Nominated)
1973
Best TV Show – Musical/Comedy (Won)
Best TV Actor – Musical/Comedy: Carroll O'Connor (Nominated)
Best TV Actress – Musical/Comedy: Jean Stapleton (Won)
Best Supporting Actor – Television: Rob Reiner (Nominated)
Best Supporting Actress – Television: Sally Struthers (Nominated)
1974
Best TV Show – Musical/Comedy (Won)
Best TV Actor – Musical/Comedy: Carroll O'Connor (Nominated)
Best TV Actress – Musical/Comedy: Jean Stapleton (Won)
Best Supporting Actor – Television: Rob Reiner (Nominated)
Best Supporting Actress – Television: Sally Struthers (Nominated)

1975
Best TV Show – Musical/Comedy (Nominated)
Best TV Actor – Musical/Comedy: Carroll O'Connor (Nominated)
Best TV Actress – Musical/Comedy: Jean Stapleton (Nominated)
Best Supporting Actress – Television: Betty Garrett (Won)
1976
Best TV Actor – Musical/Comedy: Carroll O'Connor (Nominated)
Best Supporting Actor – Television: Rob Reiner (Nominated)
1977
Best Supporting Actor – Television: Rob Reiner (Nominated)
Best Supporting Actress – Television: Sally Struthers (Nominated)
1978
Best TV Series – Musical/Comedy (Won)
Best TV Actor – Musical/Comedy: Carroll O'Connor (Nominated)
Best TV Actress – Musical/Comedy: Jean Stapleton (Nominated)
1979
Best TV Series – Musical/Comedy (Nominated)
Best TV Actress – Musical/Comedy: Jean Stapleton (Nominated)
1980
Best TV Actress – Musical/Comedy: Jean Stapleton (Nominated)

TCA Heritage Award
In 2013, the Television Critics Association honored All in the Family with its Heritage Award for its cultural and social impact on society.

See also
 All in a Family
 List of American television shows based on foreign shows
 List of All in the Family episodes

Notes

References

Further reading
 
Cullen, Jim, 1962–. Those Were the days: Why All in the Family Still Matters. New Brunswick. . OCLC 1100000865.
 
 
 Moriarty, Jay (2020). Honky in the House: Writing & Producing The Jeffersons. Antler Publishing  (print)  (ebook). (Mentions AITF episodes, especially, "The Draft Dodger", Good Times, Maude and working with Norman Lear.)

External links

 All in the Family Sitcom
 All in the Family TV Show on Facebook
 
 All in the Family on emmys.com
 All in the Family on TVLand.com
 All in the Family on TV.Com 
 

 
1970s American satirical television series
1970s American sitcoms
1971 American television series debuts
1979 American television series endings
American television series based on British television series
Best Musical or Comedy Series Golden Globe winners
CBS original programming
English-language television shows
Mass media portrayals of the working class
Nielsen ratings winners
Peabody Award-winning television programs
Primetime Emmy Award for Outstanding Comedy Series winners
Social realism
Super Bowl lead-out shows
Television controversies in the United States
Television series created by Norman Lear
Television series by Sony Pictures Television
Television series about dysfunctional families
Television series about marriage
Television shows set in Queens
Till Death Us Do Part
Queens, New York, in fiction